Fluocortin butyl (brand names Lenen, Novoderm, Varlane, Vaspit), or fluocortin 21-butylate, is a synthetic glucocorticoid corticosteroid which is marketed in Germany, Belgium, Luxembourg, Spain, and Italy. Chemically, it is the butyl ester derivative of fluocortin.

It was patented in 1971 and approved for medical use in 1977.

References

Corticosteroid esters
Esters
Organofluorides
Glucocorticoids
Pregnanes